Michael Charles Dulin (25 October 1935 – 16 March 2021) was an English former professional footballer who played for Welwyn Garden City and Tottenham Hotspur.

Playing career
Dulin was born in Stepney, England, and was Jewish. He began his career at non-league club Welwyn Garden City before joining Tottenham Hotspur in November 1952. The winger made his debut against Burnley on 17 December 1955  and went on to feature in 11 matches and scored two goals in all competitions between 1952 and 1958 before injury forced him to retire from the game.

Post-football career
After retiring from competitive football, Dulin took the post of a fire brigade welfare officer. He later became a sports development officer with the London Borough of Waltham Forest, and managed Barking. Dulin lived in Hertford but kept a football connection with Wingate & Finchley, where he was the life vice president of the club. Dulin died on 16 March 2021

See also
List of select Jewish football (association; soccer) players

References

1935 births
2021 deaths
Footballers from Stepney
English footballers
English Jews
English Football League players
Welwyn Garden City F.C. players
Tottenham Hotspur F.C. players
Barking F.C. managers
Association football wingers
English football managers